Granastyochus nigropunctatus is a species of longhorn beetles of the subfamily Lamiinae. It was described by Bates in 1881, and is known from eastern Mexico, Guatemala, and Honduras.

References

Beetles described in 1881
Acanthocinini